The Sievert integral, named after Swedish medical physicist Rolf Sievert, is a special function commonly encountered in radiation transport calculations. 

It plays a role in the sievert (symbol: Sv) unit of ionizing radiation dose in the International System of Units (SI).

Definition

References

External links

Special functions